The Norwegian railway network consists as of March 2010 of  of line, owned and managed by the Norwegian National Rail Administration. Of this,  has regular traffic. This includes 30 lines in regular traffic and 10 lines with irregular traffic. Twenty-four of these lines are electrified. Norway's longest is the Nordland Line, which runs  from Trondheim to Bodø. The longest electrified line is the Sørlandet Line, which runs  from Drammen to Stavanger.

The Drammen Line, the Gardermoen Line and the Asker Line are the only to be double track in their entire length.

List
The following list contains all non-industrial railways to be completed in Norway. The list states the line's name and its terminal stations, or terminal points, if it does not terminate at a station. The list indicates if the line was opened as a private railway (one not owned or operated by NSB, and since 1996 by the National Rail Administration), and if the private line was later nationalized. The list also states which gauge the line was built in, and if it later has been converted to another gauge.
The overall length and length of double track are given in kilometers and miles; this is the route length, not the length of the track. For those lines that have the full route in operation, the distance is the current length, while for lines that have been closed partially or in full, it is the length at the time of the opening. Next is listed if the line is electrified or not, and if the line was electrified at a different system than the standard  used by NSB and the National Rail Administration. The list then states the number of stations, bridges and tunnels on the line; for currently operating lines, this is the current count, while for other lines, it is the peak count in the line's history. The list then states the date the first section of line was taken into use and the date the last section of the line was taken into use. These dates may or may not be the same day that the official opening took place. For those railways that have been closed in full, the date of the closing (the first date without permitted revenue transport) is stated, along with if the track remains or not, and if the line has been taken into use by a heritage railway. This column also states if part of the railway has been closed for revenue traffic.

References

Bibliography

 
Norway
Railway lines